The men's 220 yards at the 1962 British Empire and Commonwealth Games as part of the athletics programme was held at the Perry Lakes Stadium on Monday 26 November and Thursday 29 November 1962.

The top four runners in each of the initial six heats qualified for the second round. Those 24 runners competed in four heats in the second round, with the top three runners from each heat qualifying for the semifinals. There were two semifinals, and only the top three from each heat advanced to the final.

The event was won by Kenyan Seraphino Antao in 21.1 seconds, who also won the 100 yards earlier in the meet. Antao finished 0.4 seconds ahead of Englishman David Jones and 0.5 seconds ahead Johan du Preez representing the Federation of Rhodesia and Nyasaland who won bronze. Antao equalled the Games record of 20.9 seconds in the first semi final, whilst the second semi final saw the defending championship Tom Robinson and the world record holder Peter Radford fail to make to the final, finishing fourth and fifth respectively.

Two of the favourites pulled out of the event prior to their heats. Canadian Harry Jerome, who pulled up 30 yards of the finish line in the 100 yards final, pulled out due to a torn muscle in his left thigh and tonsillitis. Whilst Jamaican Dennis Johnson, who finished fifth in 100 yards, withdrew due to a groin injury.

Records

The following records were established during the competition:

Round 1

Heat 1

Heat 2

Heat 3

Heat 4

Heat 5

Heat 6

Round 2

Heat 1

Heat 2

Heat 3

Heat 4

Semifinals

Semifinal 1

Semifinal 2

Final

References

Men's 220 yards
1962